Rodney Lloyd Pantages (January 24, 1929 – July 5, 2012) was a Canadian football player who played for the Calgary Stampeders, Montreal Alouettes, Edmonton Eskimos and Saskatchewan Roughriders. He won the Grey Cup with the Stampeders in 1948 and the Eskimos in 1954. He was also a handball player in his later life, winning a national championship.

References

External links

1929 births
2012 deaths
Players of Canadian football from British Columbia
Canadian football running backs
Canadian football punters
Calgary Stampeders players
Montreal Alouettes players
Edmonton Elks players
Saskatchewan Roughriders players
Canadian football people from Vancouver